Moses Young (30 September 1829 – 14 July 1909) served as magistrate of the British Overseas Territory of Pitcairn Island four times, between 1865 and 1881. Young married Albina McCoy, and together they had 12 children. Moses and Albina Young are important genetically, they are ancestors of the people who live on the island today.

Ancestry

References

Pitcairn Islands politicians
1829 births
1909 deaths
Pitcairn Islands people of Saint Kitts and Nevis descent
Pitcairn Islands people of Polynesian descent
Pitcairn Islands people of Manx descent
Pitcairn Islands people of English descent